David R. Morgan is a retired professor of political science at the University of Oklahoma where he was the Henry Bellmon Chair of Public Service.

Morgan served two years as the first city manager of Yukon, Oklahoma.

In 2004 he received the Distinguished Service Award from the Southwestern Social Science Association.

Writings by David R. Morgan

Managing Urban America with Robert E. England (1999)
Oklahoma Politics and Policies with Robert E. England, George Humphreys (1992),

References

 Samuel A. kirkpatrick, David R. Morgan, Thomas G. Kielhorn, The Oklahoma Voter (Norman, OK, University of Oklahoma Press, 1977)

External links

Year of birth missing (living people)
Living people
University of Oklahoma faculty
American city managers
American non-fiction environmental writers
People from Yukon, Oklahoma
American political scientists